Jack and Dean of All Trades, often shortened to JADOAT, is a television series following two friends who resign from the bank and become temps, taking on a variety of different jobs which all end badly. The first episode released in 2016. The series has 2 seasons and 12 episodes fully released on Fullscreen as of April 2017. The two creators, Jack Howard and Dean Dobbs, have a YouTube channel, in which they make comedy sketches that often end on a darker note. Both also have their own individual channels. It has been confirmed by Jack that there will not be a third season of JADOAT. However, Jack and Dean were able to reclaim the rights to release the two seasons of the show on their YouTube channel, broadcast through December 2018. This run ended with the premiere of an exclusive final episode on Christmas Day, wrapping up the show without the need for a third season.

Episodes 

Episode 1x1, Baking Bad, was released on Jack & Dean's YouTube channel, on 24 June 2016, and episode 1x3, Dad Men, was uploaded to their channel, on 21 April 2017. Lifeguards, which is the first episode of season 2, was also uploaded to the channel on 16 March 2017.

In December 2018, following the closure of Fullscreen's on demand video services, all 13 episode of the series were uploaded to the JackAndDean YouTube channel.

Cast and crew 
 Creators - Jack Howard, Dean Dobbs
 Directors - Jack Howard, Matt Holt
 Writers - Dean Dobbs, Jack Howard, Paul Neafcy

Series cast  
Dean Dobbs as Dean (12 episodes, 2016-2017)
Jack Howard as Jack (12 episodes, 2016-2017)
Jessica Hynes as Marv (12 episodes, 2016-2017)
Jessica Mescall as Lottie (6 episodes, 2017)
Andrea Valls as Emma (4 episodes, 2016-2017)
Rosie Armstrong as Banker (1 episode, 2016)
Richard Clark as Bank clerk (1 episode, 2016)
Matt Holt as Baker on TV (1 episode, 2016)
Paddy Hughes as Baker on TV (1 episode, 2016)
Daniel J. Layton as Narrator on TV (1 episode, 2016)
Fergus March as Baker on TV (1 episode, 2016)
Paul Neafcy as Angry Queue Guy (1 episode, 2016)
Colin Burt Vidler as Dad (bank robber) (1 episode, 2016)
Toby Williams as Bank Manager (1 episode, 2016)

Awards and nominations

2015

2016

References

External links

2016 American television series debuts
2018 American television series endings